Palkot Wildlife Sanctuary is a wildlife sanctuary located near Palkot. It is spread over Gumla and Simdega districts of Jharkhand in India.

Geography

Note: The map alongside presents some of the notable locations in the district. All places marked in the map are linked in the larger full screen map.

Location

Area overview 
The map alongside presents a rugged area, consisting partly of flat-topped hills called pat and partly of an undulating plateau, in the south-western portion of Chota Nagpur Plateau. Three major rivers – the Sankh, South Koel and North Karo - along with their numerous tributaries, drain the area. The hilly area has large deposits of Bauxite. 93.7% of the population lives in rural areas.

The sanctuary
It was established in 1990. It covers an area around 760 sq km of which 182.83 sq km is forest area. It has Dry Deciduous Forest. It provides a refuge for elephants, leopards, bears, jackal, monkey, porcupine, and hare.

It is located at 25 Km from Gumla and 92 Km southeast of Ranchi.

References

Wildlife sanctuaries in Jharkhand
Gumla district
1990 establishments in Bihar
Protected areas established in 1990